Write Bloody Publishing is an independent American publishing house, founded in 2004 by traveling poet Derrick C. Brown.

Authors and titles

References

External links 
 Write Bloody Publishing

Publishing companies of the United States
Publishing companies established in 2004